Dylan Fitzell is an Irish sportsperson.  He plays hurling with his local club Cashel King Cormacs and with the Tipperary senior inter-county team since 2016.

Career
Fitzell was named in the Tipperary squad for the 2016 National Hurling League and made his league debut on 13 February against Dublin when he came on as a substitute, and scored a point from play.

Honours

Tipperary
All-Ireland Minor Hurling Championship (1): 2012
Munster Minor Hurling Championship (1): 2012
All-Ireland Minor Football Championship (1): 2011
Munster Minor Football Championship (1): 2011

References

External links
Tipperary GAA Player Profile

Tipperary inter-county hurlers
Cashel King Cormac's hurlers
Living people
Year of birth missing (living people)